Tilghman Mayfield Tucker (February 5, 1802 – April 3, 1859) was Governor of Mississippi from 1842 to 1844.  He was a Democrat.

Biography
Tucker was born in North Carolina near Lime Stone Springs, and lived in Alabama for a time before moving to Mississippi.  He left his career of blacksmithing and studied law under Judge Daniel W. Wright in Hamilton, Mississippi.  office in Columbus, Mississippi.

Tucker was elected in 1831 to the Mississippi House of Representatives as a Democrat and was the first representative from Lowndes County, and served until 1835. From 1838 to 1841 he served in the state senate.

In 1837 he had 3 male slaves and 4 female slaves according to the state census.

By 1841, the aftermath of the Panic of 1837 had caused a division among Mississippi Democrats. The issue was whether the state would honor the bonds of the Planters Bank and Union Bank, both of which had failed in the panic. Some Democrats stated that they would support the Whig gubernatorial candidate David Shattuck who wanted the redemption of the bonds. Though Tucker was at first reluctant to accept the Democratic nomination in a hopeless race, he accepted and won with a narrow victory.

During Tucker's two-year term (1842–1844), the Democratic Party remained divided over the bond issue.  Also, Tucker's political opponents accused him of not acting fast enough in matter of state treasurer Richard S. Graves, who had embezzled $44,000 of state funding and fled to Canada.

Tucker did not run for re-election, but he did win one term in the U.S. House of Representatives from March 4, 1843 to March 3, 1845. He then retired from public life and moved to his Louisiana plantation home named Cottonwood.  While visiting his father near Bexar in Marion County, Alabama, Tucker died on April 3, 1859.

References

1802 births
1859 deaths
Democratic Party governors of Mississippi
Democratic Party members of the Mississippi House of Representatives
Democratic Party members of the United States House of Representatives from Mississippi
19th-century American politicians
American slave owners